Sharon Beder is an environmentalist and a former professor in the Faculty of Arts at the University of Wollongong in New South Wales, Australia. Her research has focused on how power relationships are maintained and challenged, particularly by corporations and professions. She has written 11 books, and many articles, book chapters and conference papers, as well as designing teaching resources and educational websites.

Early life and family
Beder was born in 1956, in Wellington, New Zealand.

Education
Beder initially trained and worked as a civil engineer in New Zealand before becoming interested in the social, political and philosophical aspects of engineering and then environmental politics. She completed a PhD in Science and Technology Studies at the University of New South Wales in 1989 based on research into the process of engineering decision-making using a case study on the development of Sydney's sewerage system.

Appointments
Before joining the University of Wollongong in 1992, Beder was Environmental Education Co-ordinator at the University of Sydney. She has also been Chairperson of the Environmental Engineering Branch of the Institution of Engineers, Sydney, President of the Society for Social Responsibility in Engineering, and a director of the Earth Foundation Australia.

Awards
Beder was included in a list of "Australia's most influential engineers", published by Engineers Australia in 2004.  She was also included in Bulletin Magazine's "Smart 100" in 2003. Her awards include:

High Commendation for IEAust Award for Cultural Change in Engineering Education, 1998
Michael Daley Award for Excellence in Science, Technology and Engineering Journalism, 1992 
Commonwealth Postgraduate Award, 1985-1988

Books
 Beder, Sharon. (1989). Toxic Fish and Sewer Surfing. (Allen & Unwin, Sydney)
 Beder, Sharon. (1996). The Nature of Sustainable Development. (Scribe Publications, Melbourne)
 Beder, Sharon. (1998). The New Engineer: Management and Professional Responsibility in a Changing World. (Macmillan, Melbourne)
 Beder, Sharon. (1997). Global Spin: The Corporate Assault on Environmentalism (Green Books, Devon, UK, October 1997, 2nd edition – May 2002)
 
 
 Beder, Sharon. (2006). Environmental Principles and Policies (UNSW Press, Sydney, Australia Paperback, Publication date: September 2006) & EARTHSCAN, London, UK Paperback, Publication date: October 2006).
 Beder, Sharon. (2006). Suiting Themselves: How Corporations Drive the Global Agenda. (Earthscan, London)
 Beder, Sharon. (2006). Free Market Missionaries: The Corporate Manipulation of Community Values. (Earthscan, London)
 Beder, Sharon. (2009). This Little Kiddy Went to Market: The Corporate Capture of Childhood. (Pluto Press, London)
 Beder, Sharon. (2022). Nellie-Roo: The Orphan Joey. (Wildlife Storybooks)

See also

Dioxin controversy
Marine Outfall
Deregulation

References

Living people
Australian non-fiction writers
Australian environmentalists
Australian women environmentalists
Non-fiction environmental writers
University of New South Wales alumni
Academic staff of the University of Wollongong
Academic staff of the University of Sydney
Ethics of science and technology
Environmental social scientists
Science and technology studies scholars
Year of birth missing (living people)
20th-century Australian women writers
20th-century Australian writers
21st-century Australian women writers
21st-century Australian writers